Harold René Charles Marie, comte d'Aspremont Lynden (17 January 1914 - 1 April 1967) was a Belgian cabinet minister, politician of the PSC-CVP and Cavalry Lieutenant-Colonel. He is also notable as Belgium's last Minister of African Affairs (1960-1961), serving as such in Gaston Eyskens' third cabinet. He was one of the Belgian authorities involved in the kidnap and assassination of Congolese Prime Minister Patrice Lumumba.

Life
He was born in 1914 to Count Charles d'Aspremont Lynden (a parliamentarian and cabinet minister) and Edith de Favereau (daughter of Paul de Favereau, another cabinet minister). After studying classics at the abbey school at Maredsous from 1926 to 1931, he graduated from the Catholic University of Leuven as a doctor of law. He completed his military service as a reserve officer in the 13th Line Regiment at Namur (14 October 1936 – 14 October 1937) before returning to Leuven to study social and political economics.

His studies were interrupted by the outbreak of World War Two and the general mobilisation of Belgium in September 1939. After the fall of Belgium he joined the resistance, commanding Sector V in Zone V of the Secret Army. After the war he became a member of the town council and mayor of Natoye (1947-1967) and senator for the province of Namur (1949-1954 and 1961-1967). 

He died in Natoye in 1967.

Involvement in the assassination of Patrice Lumumba
In the early 21st century, writer Ludo De Witte found documents revealing that Belgian authorities were directly involved in the murder of Lumumba. Count d'Aspremont Lynden, who had been tasked with organising Katanga's secession, on 6 October 1960, sent a cable to Katanga saying that policy from now on would be the "definitive elimination of Patrice Lumumba". Lynden had also insisted on 15 January 1961, that an imprisoned Lumumba should be sent to Katanga, which essentially would have been a death sentence.

Honours 
 Commander of the Ordre de Léopold, 
 Knight of the Ordre de Léopold with palms
 Croix de Guerre 1940 with palms
 Médaille de la Résistance 1940-1945, 
 Médaille commémorative de la guerre 1940-1945 with crossed sabres
 Commander of the Ordre d'Orange-Nassau of the Netherlands
King's Medal for Courage in the Cause of Freedom

References

1914 births
1967 deaths
Politicians from Brussels
Members of the Senate (Belgium)
Mayors of places in Belgium
Belgian resistance members
Lynden family
Commanders of the Order of Orange-Nassau
Recipients of the Resistance Medal
Recipients of the King's Medal for Courage in the Cause of Freedom
Counts of Belgium